Edward Yechezkel Kutscher or Yechezkel Kutscher (1 June 1909 – 12 December 1971) was an Israeli philologist and Hebrew linguist.

Biography 
Kutscher was born in 1909 in Topoľčany, Slovakia, then part of the Austro-Hungarian Empire. He studied at the yeshiva in his home town and, later, in Frankfurt. In 1931 he emigrated to Mandatory Palestine and continued with his studies at the Mercaz HaRav Yeshiva and at a Mizrachi Movement teachers seminary. For several years subsequently, he taught at various schools in Tel Aviv and Jerusalem.

In 1941, he completed his studies in Hebrew linguistics at the Hebrew University of Jerusalem and, in 1949, began lecturing in linguistics at the Hebrew University, which he continued to do until his death. In 1960 he was appointed a professor. In 1958 he also started lecturing at Bar-Ilan University.

For many years Kutscher was a member of the Academy of the Hebrew Language and its predecessor, the Hebrew Language Committee (Vaʻad ha-lashon ha-ʻIvrit). In 1965 he was appointed editor of the periodical Leshonenu ("Our Language").

Kutscher was regarded as "probably the greatest living authority on Aramaic until his death in 1971." His research work included the study of different Mishnaic Hebrew scripts, including the Kaufmann Manuscript and Dead Sea Scrolls. His work revealed the Kaufmann Manuscript to be most authentic of the Mishnah.

Awards 
 In 1961, Kutscher was awarded the Israel Prize, for the humanities.

See also 
List of Israel Prize recipients

References 

Hebraists
Mercaz HaRav alumni
Hebrew University of Jerusalem alumni
Academic staff of the Hebrew University of Jerusalem
Academic staff of Bar-Ilan University
Israel Prize in humanities recipients
Slovak Jews
Czechoslovak emigrants to Mandatory Palestine
Jews in Mandatory Palestine
20th-century Israeli Jews
1909 births
1971 deaths